Tønnesson is a Norwegian surname. Notable people with the surname include:

Kåre Tønnesson (1926–2019), Norwegian historian 
Stein Tønnesson (born 1953), Norwegian historian

Norwegian-language surnames